= DYP (app) =

DYP, also known as Digital Yearbook Page, is an iOS social discovery app that facilitates interaction between mutually interested classmates. It differs from other social networks and anonymous sharing apps in that it is primarily for reconnecting with former classmates using their yearbook photos. Classmates are kept exclusive to each other, with limited access to other school years.

== History ==
Currently incorporated in Delaware, DYP was founded in Los Angeles, California by Robert Nunn, a former real estate broker and Samuel Zaribian, a former marketing consultant. Robert Nunn has said “the idea came to me when I was cleaning my closet and stumbled across my old high school yearbook. Browsing through it I wondered what happened to some of my classmates but I didn’t want to search classmates one by one on social networks for the answer”. The company raised $125k in seed funding in 2013. The app was released in the Apple Store on April 28, 2014, with plans of an Android version release in the works.

== Reception ==
Technology commentators likened DYP to a High School version of Tinder and Facebook at its early stage. Notably, Yahoo News called DYP ‘A Facebook for Yearbooks’. Samuel Zaribian has emphasized in interviews that DYP is not trying to replace any social network or the printed yearbook and should be used as a tool for schools and publishers to sell more printed yearbooks in the digital era.
